The  is a museum in the capital city of Shiga Prefecture, Japan. 

First opened in November of 1948 as the Shiga Prefecture Sangyou-Bunkakan, the Museum of Shiga Prefecture Biwako-Bunkakan formally came into existence in 1961. It was closed in 2008 before having its collections taken over by the Museum of Modern Art, Shiga. It was closed for renovations in March, 2021.

Building Layout 

 1st Floor - Gallery
 2nd Floor - Planned Exhibitions, Exhibitions on Buddhism
 3rd Floor - Themed Exhibition Room, Early Modern Era Displays, Modern Era Displays
 4th Floor - Panel Display Room, Lake Biwa and Omi Culture Exhibitions
 5th Floor - Observation Deck

References 

Buildings and structures in Ōtsu
Museums in Shiga Prefecture
Museums established in 1961